Sevakudu is a 2013 Indian Telugu-language vigilante film directed by V. Samudra and starring Srikanth and Charmy Kaur. The film was dubbed in Tamil as  Ini Oru Vidhi Seivom and released in 2014.

Cast 

 Srikanth as Surya
 Charmy Kaur
 Nassar as Ramachandrayya 
 Pradeep Rawat as Balram Jadoo
 M. S. Narayana as Narayana
 Brahmanandam as Brahmi
 Ahuti Prasad
 Manjula Ghattamaneni as Manjula
 Chitti Babu
 Chalapathi Rao 
 Vijayachander
 Hema
 Dasanna
 Jenny
 Sivaji Raja
 Tirupathi Prakash
 Srinivasa Reddy as Raju, Surya's friend
 Sangeetha
 Sattanna
 Krishna as Krishna Prasad (cameo appearance)

Production 
The film began production in 2010 with Srikanth and Vimala Raman in the lead roles; however, Raman was later replaced by Charmy Kaur. The film released in 2013 due to much delay. Manjula Ghattamaneni  and Krishna were signed to portray guest roles.

Soundtrack 
Music by Srikanth Deva.
"Adugadugo Sevakudu" - Nagur Babu
"Magadheerullona Maharjathakudammo" - Karthik, Anuradha Sriram
"Guddu Guddu" - S. P. Balasubrahmanyam
"Aa Devudu Puttinchadu" - Harish Raghavendra, Chinmayi
"Abbayi Andhra Mirchi" - Ranjith, Sravya

Release 
The film was scheduled to be released in February 2012, but was delayed to January 2013. The Times of India gave the film a rating of one-and-a-half out of five stars and noted that " It's another vigilante movie that's very low on IQ and high on misplaced jingoism". News18 wrote that "Call it a passe or simply lazy filmmaking, but all that the Telugu film 'Sevakudu manages at the end is present you with a rehash of several Telugu films released over the year".

References

External links 

Indian vigilante films
2010s Telugu-language films
2013 films
2010s vigilante films